Önal is a Turkish surname. Notable people with the surname include:

 Ayşe Önal (born 1955), Turkish female journalist and writer
 Ayşe Hatun Önal (born 1978), Turkish model
 Funda Önal (born 1984), English model
 Füsun Önal, Turkish female pop singer
 Güldeniz Önal (born 1986), Turkish volleyball player
 Murat Önal (born 1987), Turkish footballer

Turkish-language surnames